Zach Harrison (born August 14, 2001) is an American football defensive end for the Ohio State Buckeyes.

Early life and high school career
Harrison attended Olentangy Orange High School in Lewis Center, Ohio. He played in the 2019 All-American Bowl. A five-star recruit, Harrison committed to Ohio State University to play college football.

College career
Harrison spent his true freshman season at Ohio State in 2019, as a backup to Chase Young. He played in all 14 games with one start and had 24 tackles and 3.5 sacks. With Young in the NFL, Harrison was expected to take over as a starter in 2020.

References

External links
Ohio State Buckeyes bio

Living people
People from Lewis Center, Ohio
Players of American football from Ohio
American football defensive ends
Ohio State Buckeyes football players
2001 births